India–New Zealand relations are the interactions between India and New Zealand. Both these countries were once part of the British Empire.  There are approximately 175,000 people of Indian descent in New Zealand.

Bilateral relations were established between India and New Zealand in 1952. India has a High Commission in Wellington with an Honorary Consulate in Auckland, while New Zealand has a High Commission in New Delhi along with a Consulate in Mumbai, trade offices in New Delhi and Mumbai and an Honorary Consulate in Chennai.

India–New Zealand relations were cordial but not extensive after Indian independence.  More recently, New Zealand has shown interest in extending ties with India due to India's impressive GDP growth.

The countries set up a Joint Trade Committee in 1983 and have had discussions on a free trade agreement either bilaterally or through the East Asian Summit, but this has not emerged due to disagreements over agricultural subsidies.  There is also some educational cooperation, with around 23,000 Indian students studying in New Zealand.

Defence cooperation has been more limited, but there have been joint naval exercises, and Indian and New Zealand troops have served together in United Nations peacekeeping missions in Kosovo and Sudan.

Pranab Mukherjee became the first Indian President to visit New Zealand in August 2016.
7 November The government of India notified the third protocol between India and New Zealand for avoidance of double taxation and prevention of fiscal evasion with respect to taxes on income.

On 27 November 2017, the first India-New Zealand Cyber Dialogue was held in New Delhi.
The Indian Delegation was led by Mr. Sanjay Kumar Verma, Additional Secretary, Ministry of External Affairs. The New Zealand delegation was led by Mr. Paul Ash, Director of the National Cyber Policy Office, Department of Prime Minister and Cabinet.
Areas of discussion included domestic cyber policy landscape, cyber threats and mitigation, new technologies, mechanism on bilateral cooperation and possible cooperation at various international fora and regional fora. Both sides agreed to hold the next India-New Zealand Cyber dialogue in New Zealand in 2018.

New Zealand Foreign Minister, Nanaia Mahuta visited India and conducted bilateral talks with Indian Foreign Minister S. Jaishankar. The talks centered around taking the bilateral relationship to the next level, including exploring future economic relationship, cooperation in International Solar Alliance, improved air connectivity and private sector collaboration. She is also promoting New Zealand's education, trade and tourism sector.  Indian Foreign Minister S.Jaishankar stated that "A warm and wide ranging conversation with FM Nanaia Mahuta of New Zealand this evening. Discussion covered our expanding ties that is being reflected in increased frequency of our contacts. Shared views on the global situation from our vantage points, including on the Indo-Pacific. Appreciated her perspectives of the region. Welcome New Zealand’s joining the International Solar Alliance.”

New Zealand India Research Institute 
The New Zealand India Research Institute is a result of the increasing co-operation. Based at Victoria University in Wellington it will involve nearly 40 academics in five New Zealand universities – Victoria, Auckland, Massey, Canterbury and Otago - in  research on India and NZ-India relations. The inaugural meeting of the India-New Zealand Education Council took place in 2012 when the Institute was established.

See also 

Indian New Zealander

References

External links

 High Commission of India in Wellington
 High Commission of New Zealand in New Delhi
 India and New Zealand in the Asian Century 2007 New Zealand government press release

 
New Zealand
Bilateral relations of New Zealand